Jilani Park (formerly known as Race Course Park) is located in the city of Lahore, Punjab, Pakistan. It is on the Jail Road in front of the Services Hospital. It is famous for its floral exhibitions and artificial waterfall. Annual horse racing competitions are held in this park. There is also a famous restaurant inside the park called 'Polo Lounge'. It is named after Ghulam Jilani Khan.

See also
 Lahore Race Club
 List of parks and gardens in Lahore
 List of parks and gardens in Pakistan
 List of parks and gardens in Karachi

References

Lahore
Parks in Lahore
Tourist attractions in Lahore
1985 establishments in Pakistan